The third season of Solsidan, a Swedish television comedy series, created by comedian and actor Felix Herngren, Jacob Seth Fransson, Ulf Kvensler and Pontus Edgren premiered on October 7, 2012 on TV4.

Episodes

References

External links
Official website
Solsidan on Facebook

2012 Swedish television seasons
3